Mike Bozzi is an American mastering engineer at Bernie Grundman Mastering in Hollywood, California. He won a Grammy Award for Record of the Year for mastering Childish Gambino's "This Is America", and is a six-time nominee for the Grammy Award for Album of the Year for his works with Kendrick Lamar and Marwan Pablo and also a six-time nominee for Record of the Year.

Career 
Bozzi worked as an usher at Greek Theatre and as an intern at A&M Records.

Bozzi has mastered music for BK, Schoolboy Q, SZA, Tyler, the Creator, Mac Miller, Ice Cube, Snoop Dogg, YG, Earl Sweatshirt, Tupac Shakur, Young Buck, Linkin Park, Giggs, Sobhhï , Marwan Pablo and others.

Awards and nominations 

!
|-
|align=center|2013
|Good Kid, M.A.A.D City
|rowspan="3"| Grammy Award for Album of the Year
|
|rowspan="13"| 
|-
|align=center|2015
|To Pimp a Butterfly
|
|-
|rowspan="2"| 2017
|DAMN.
|
|-
|"HUMBLE."
|rowspan="4"| Grammy Award for Record of the Year
|
|-
|rowspan="5"| 2018
|"All the Stars"
|
|-
|"Rockstar"
|
|-
|"This Is America"
|
|-
|Beerbongs & Bentleys
|rowspan="2"| Grammy Award for Album of the Year
|
|-
|Black Panther: The Album, Music from and Inspired By
|
|-
|align=center|2019
|"Sunflower"
|rowspan="3"| Grammy Award for Record of the Year
|
|-
|rowspan="3"| 2020
|"Circles"
|
|-
|"Say So"
|
|-
|Hollywood's Bleeding
|Grammy Award for Album of the Year
|
|-

Externals links

References

Living people
Mastering engineers
Grammy Award winners for rap music
People from Hollywood, Los Angeles
Year of birth missing (living people)